
Gmina Koczała is a rural gmina (administrative district) in Człuchów County, Pomeranian Voivodeship, in northern Poland.

Villages
Gmina Koczała contains the villages and settlements of Adamki, Bielsko, Bryle, Ciemino, Dymin, Działek, Dźwierzeński Młyn, Dźwierzno, Kałka, Koczała, Łękinia, Niedźwiady, Niesiłowo, Ostrówek, Pietrzykówko, Pietrzykowo, Płocicz, Podlesie, Potoki, Stara Brda, Stara Brda Pilska, Starzno, Strużka, Świerkówko, Trzyniec, Wilkowo, Zagaje, Załęże, Zapadłe and Żukowo.

Neighbouring gminas
Gmina Koczała is bordered by the gminas of Biały Bór, Lipnica, Miastko, Przechlewo and Rzeczenica.

References
Polish official population figures 2006

Koczala
Człuchów County